The 1908 Dickinson  Red and White football team was an American football team that represented Dickinson College as an independent during the 1908 college football season. The team compiled a 5–4 record and was outscored by a total of 77 to 69. Paul J. Davis was the head coach.

Schedule

References

Dickinson
Dickinson Red Devils football seasons
Dickinson Red and White football